The 1939 Soviet football championship was the 9th seasons of competitive football in the Soviet Union and the 5th among teams of sports societies and factories. FC Spartak Moscow won the championship becoming the winner of Group A for the third time. 

The defending champions Spartak Moscow, while struggling in the first half of season, they made a great run in the second half and successfully defended their domestic title.

Honours

Notes = Number in parentheses is the times that club has won that honour. * indicates new record for competition

Organization
The 1938 USSR football championship competitions are conducted by the All-Union Committee on sports and physical culture under rules adopted in 1939. Matches between teams are played in double round-robin tournament: on own and opponents' turf fields. Number of players for each team should not exceed more than 18. Players who are on the roster to play in Soviet championship cannot participate for teams of their society in local city competitions. The team that receives the most points in the Soviet championship is awarded with the title of champion and the All-Union Committee banner. Players as well as politruks and coaches are given tokens and certificates of the All-Union Committee.

Teams are obligated to participate until end of the season's calendar. Team that were withdrawn from competition on decision of the All-Union Committee or other reasons are barred to compete in 1940. Results (points) that were received by all teams in matches with the withdrawn team are zeroed. Players of the withdrawn team don't have a right to play for other sports organizations that compete in the Soviet championship this season without permission of the Central Sports Inspecition.

On equal points among teams, the order of their placement is determined by a coefficient of scored and allowed goals (goal ratio).

Undisciplined players who were ejected out of the field by a referee for a foul are barred from other matches until the decisions of the Disciplinary and Conflict Commission and the Central Sports Inspection.

The last three teams of the 1939 championship are relegated from the first group to the second for the 1940 season. The top two teams of the Second Group of the 1939 championship are promoted to the First Group for the 1940 season.

Soviet Cup

Spartak Moscow beat Stalinets Leningrad 3–1 in the Soviet Cup final. As in the last season, the decisive goal was scored by Viktor Semyonov.

Soviet Union football championship

Group A

Group B

Top goalscorers

Group A
Grigoriy Fedotov (CDKA Moscow) – 21 goals

Group B
Nikolai Korzunov (Dinamo Rostov-na-Donu) – 19 goals

Republican level
Football competitions of union republics

Football championships
 Azerbaijan SSR – Lokomotiv Baku
 Armenian SSR – Spartak Yerevan
 Belarusian SSR – Dinamo Minsk (see Football Championship of the Belarusian SSR)
 Georgian SSR – Nauka Tbilisi
 Kazakh SSR – none
 Kirgiz SSR – Dinamo Frunze
 Russian SFSR – none
 Tajik SSR – none
 Turkmen SSR – none
 Uzbek SSR – Dinamo Tashkent
 Ukrainian SSR – Lokomotyv zavodiv Zaporizhia (see 1939 Football Championship of the Ukrainian SSR)

Football cups
 Azerbaijan SSR – Lokomotiv Baku
 Armenian SSR – Dinamo Leninakan
 Belarusian SSR – IFK Minsk
 Georgian SSR – Nauka Tbilisi
 Kazakh SSR – Dinamo Alma-Ata
 Kirgiz SSR – Dinamo Frunze
 Russian SFSR – Dinamo Voronezh
 Tajik SSR – Dinamo Stalinabad
 Turkmen SSR – Dinamo Ashkhabad
 Uzbek SSR – Dinamo Tashkent
 Ukrainian SSR – Avanhard Kramatorsk (see 1939 Cup of the Ukrainian SSR)

References

External links
 1939 Soviet football championship. RSSSF